Jean-René Lisnard (born 25 September 1979) is a professional tennis player who represents Monaco, and formerly France.  He has been a member of the Monaco Davis Cup team since 2007. He is to date, the only Monegasque tennis player to have won a match in the main draw of a Grand Slam tournament.

Tennis career
Lisnard plays right-handed, and turned professional in 1997.

He reached his career-high singles ranking of World No. 84 in January 2003. His current doubles ranking is 400 with his highest rank being 171 on 10 September 2007.

In May at the 2009 French Open, he lost his first-round match to Israeli player Dudi Sela 6–4, 6–3, 4–6, 6–3.

Lisnard qualified for the main draw of the 2011 US Open and defeated Olivier Rochus of Belgium in straight sets to advance to the second round. He lost to Germany's Florian Mayer in straight sets in the second round.

Junior Grand Slam finals

Doubles: 1 (1 runner-up)

ATP Challenger and ITF Futures finals

Singles: 18 (7–11)

Doubles: 11 (4–7)

Performance timeline

Singles

External links and sources
 
 
 

1979 births
Living people
French male tennis players
Monegasque male tennis players
Sportspeople from Cannes